Boogie Island is a small, low-lying island in the entrance to Port Lockroy, about 550 meters west of Goudier Island, Wiencke Island, Palmer Archipelago. It was roughly charted by Jean-Baptiste Charcot in 1904, and surveyed and originally named by Operation Tabarin in 1944.

References

Islands of the Palmer Archipelago